Musa Hawamda (Arabic:موسى حوامدة); born in 1959), is a Palestinian Poet, he was born in Al Sammu'i town in Hebron governorate. He studied high school in Hebron and was arrested more than once when he was a student there. He went to the University of Jordan and studied in the Arts College. He was arrested in the second year and imprisoned in solitary for three months and he got suspended of the University for one Year then he came back to study and graduated from the Department of Arabic Language in 1982.

Career 
Hawamda began to publish his poems in the supplement of Al-Dustour Al-Thaqafi newspaper in the early 1980's when he was student and published his first poetry collection entitled “Shaghab” (1988 in Amman). he was banned from traveling and working until the beginning of the democracy era in Jordan. this when he joined Al-Sha`ab newspaper, then the Al-Dustour newspaper, then editing manager at Al-Arab Al-Youm newspaper. he is working currently as editing manager of the Cultural Department in the Jordanian constitution.

Works 

 Shaghab was the first poetry collection published in 1988.
 In 1988, he published his second poetry collection “Tazdadeen Samaa Wa Basaateen” which are Love poems.
 In 1999, he published his third poem collection “Shajaray Aala” (by the Arab Foundation for Studies and Publishing in Beirut), which led to the anger of the Islamic extremists who would justify killing him. the diwan was confiscated by the Ministry of Media of Jordan in March 2000 and submitted to the legal courts on May 5. At the same year he complied to the legal court and tried five times because the Court of Appeal refused to reject the case. After the legal courts finished of the case at the end of 2001, The Ministry of Media represented by Press and Publication of Department filed a new case against him. After several months in July 2002, The court announced his aquatically on the charge of insulting religions and violating the publications law, but the Attorney General appealed the verdict against him.

A decision was issued to imprison him for three months by the Amman Criminal Court for violating the Press and Publication Law, on his famous book Shajari Alaoui, which was confiscated in Jordan.

 The Arab Foundation for Studies and Publishing published his fourth poetry book (The Journeys of Moses in the Last Era) after the Publications Department removed many poems from it.
 In 2004, he published his fifth poetry collection from The Sea Side by the Arab Foundation for Studies and Publishing in Beirut.
 In 2007, his sixth poetry book was published by Dar Al-Shorouk, titled “Sulalatay Alreeh Wa Unwanay Almatar,”.
 the Cultural Palaces Authority in Cairo issued for him, and as part of a series of Arab Creativity, an anthology of poetry entitled “Sulalatay Alreeh Wa Unwanay Almatar,” and Other Poems in 2010. "Mawta Yajuroon Alsamaa" by Arabesque House in Cairo in 2011, and the Egyptian General Book Authority reprinted the same collection in 2012.
 A second edition of "Mawta Yajuroon Alsamaa" on the Egyptian General Book Authority in Egypt 2012 as part of the Arab Creativity Series.
 A third edition of “Sulalatay Alreeh Wa Unwanay Almatar,”. within the Family Library Project / Ministry of Culture / Amman 2013.
 Body of the Sea, a robe for the poem, Dar Noon Emirates 2015.

Master thesis on his poetry:

 A master's thesis on his poetry presented by the Iraqi student, Abdul-Khaleq Farhan Ali Al-Khatouni, entitled Technical Structures in Musa Hawamdeh's Poetry at the University of Mosul 2013 AD.

- Prizes: - The prize of the Jordanian Writers Association for non-members in 1982 for the poem “Gaps”. - The “La Plume” (Badminton) prize, which is the Grand Prix awarded by the French “Fondation Oriani” Foundation in 2006, and the French Terranova Festival award. 2011 Australian Immigrant Poetry Prize.

He is a member of the Jordanian authors association, member of the Arab Writers Union. Member of the Jordanian Journalists Syndicate, member of the Administrative Board of the Arab Internet Writers Union. He participated in several Arab and European poetry festivals. His poems were translated into several languages, including Persian, English, French, German, Swedish, Roman, Kurdish, Bosnian and Turkish, and the Turkish Republic newspaper published a number of translated poems for him. He was also one of the poets of the anthology of Palestinian poetry and the anthology of Arabic love poetry in Turkish, and one of the Arab poets in the book “Unwanan Li Buzoogh Alshams Wa Azifan”, which was issued in Persian by the translation of the Iranian poet Musa Paidge. Many Arab critics and writers wrote about his poetry, including: the late poet Baland Al-Haidari, Dr. Salah Fadl, Trad al-Kubaisi, Muhammad Ali Shams al-Din, Rasim al-Madhoun, Ali Badr, Dr. Sultan al-Maani, Dr. Muhammad Ubayd Allah, Hikmat Al-Nawaysh, Dr. Muhammad Al-Qawasma, Dr. Abeer Salama, Jaafar Hassan, Naim Araidi, Khaled Zgharit, Rashid Issa, Fakhri Saleh, Yousif Yousif, Muhammad Al-Ashry, Zuhair Kazem Abboud, Makki Al-Rubaie, Abd Aoun Al-Roudhan, Miqdad Masoud, Muayad Al-Bassam, Hani Ashour, Omar Ghorab, Ali Safar, Ihab Khalifa, Omar Shahryar, Majdi Mamdouh, Dr. Linda Obeid, Dr. Abdel-Rahim Al-Marashdeh, Muhammad Al-Qassem Al-Yasseri, Wijdan Al-Sayegh, Jalal Barjas, Nidal Al-Qasim, Dr. Diana Arheel and others.

- Director Nasser Omar Directed a Movie about has poetic experience in Hauolaa Alakharoon, which was broadcast on Orbit and other TV channels.

 He has three prose books in satirical literature like: “Hikayat Al-Sumoo” (2000 by Daar Alshouroo in Ram Allah and Amman). It was translated by Laila Al-Tai Melton for the English magazine Banipal in the latest issue devoted to modern Palestinian literature.

References 

1959 births
Living people
Palestinian poets